"Get Right Witcha" is a song by American hip hop group Migos from their second studio album Culture (2017) and was produced by Murda Beatz and Zaytoven.

Composition
The song features a flute-based instrumental, and is about the Migos' lifestyle, depicted as extravagant and busy.

Critical reception
In a Complex review of Culture, the song was praised: "On 'Get Right Witcha', you go from infectious Quavo hook to fire Quavo verse to insane Offset verse and finish with Takeoff spazzing. The song never lets up the momentum, and the energy between all three Migos is palpable."

Music video
The music video for the song, directed by King Content, was released on April 5, 2017. Filmed in Sunset Ranch Hollywood, it sees the members of Migos in expensive cars, wearing jewelry, showing stacks of money, and riding horses as well. The video also shows "lingerie-clad women" dancing.

Charts

Certifications

References

2017 songs
Migos songs
Songs written by Quavo
Songs written by Takeoff (rapper)
Songs written by Offset (rapper)
Song recordings produced by Murda Beatz
Song recordings produced by Zaytoven
Songs written by Murda Beatz
Songs written by Zaytoven
300 Entertainment singles